Robert Connell may refer to:
 Raewyn Connell (born 1944), Australian sociologist
 Robert Connell (politician) (1871–1957), Scottish-Canadian Anglican priest and politician in British Columbia
 Robert Lowden Connell (1867–1936), British shipowner and politician
 Robert Connell (police commissioner) (1867–1956), commissioner of police for the state of Western Australia